The 2014 South American Race Walking Championships took place on February 15–16, 2014.  The races were held on a 2 km circuit at the Paseo El Prado in Cochabamba, Bolivia.  A detailed report of the event was given for the IAAF.

Complete results were published.

Medallists

Results

Men's 20km

†: Guest athlete.

Men's 50km

Men's 10km Junior (U20)

Men's 10km Youth (U18)

Women's 20km

†: Guest athlete.

Women's 10km Junior (U20)

Women's 5km Youth (U18)

Medal table (unofficial)

Participation
According to an unofficial count, 69 athletes (+ 4 guests) from 6 countries (+ 1 guest country) participated.

 (17)
 (17)
 (6)
 (10)
 (10)
 Perú (9)

Guest nation:
 (4)

See also
 2014 Race Walking Year Ranking

References

South American Race Walking Championships
South American Race Walking Championships
International athletics competitions hosted by Bolivia
South American Race Walking Championships
February 2014 sports events in South America